Glutinous rice (Oryza sativa var. glutinosa; also called sticky rice, sweet rice or waxy rice) is a type of rice grown mainly in Southeast and East Asia, and the northeastern regions of South Asia, which has opaque grains, very low amylose content, and is especially sticky when cooked. It is widely consumed across Asia.

It is called glutinous in the sense of being glue-like or sticky, and not in the sense of containing gluten (which it does not). While often called sticky rice, it differs from non-glutinous strains of japonica rice, which also become sticky to some degree when cooked. There are numerous cultivars of glutinous rice, which include japonica, indica and tropical japonica strains.

History

In China, glutinous rice has been grown for at least 2,000 years. However, researchers believe that glutinous rice distribution appears to have been culturally influenced and closely associated with the early southward migration and distribution of the Tai ethnic groups, particularly the Lao people along the Mekong River basin originating from Southern China.  

The history of rice cultivation in Thailand dates back over 5,000 years. Different types of rice have been cultivated in various regions during different historical periods, including glutinous rice, large-grain rice, and slender grain rice. Through archaeological research, Japanese scholars found that fortified grain was likely the glutinous-lowland variety of glutinous rice, and large-grain rice was likely glutinous rice that thrives at high altitudes. Meanwhile, slender grain rice is non-glutinous. Sticky rice has been a staple food in all regions from north to south since about 3,000 years ago, and it has played an essential role in the country's food culture

Cultivation
Glutinous rice is grown in Laos, Thailand, Cambodia, Vietnam, Malaysia, Indonesia, Myanmar, Nepal, Bangladesh, Bhutan, Northeast India, China, Japan, Korea, Taiwan, and the Philippines. An estimated 85% of Lao rice production is of this type. The rice has been recorded in the region for at least 1,100 years.

As of 2013, approximately 6,530 glutinous rice varieties were collected from five continents (Asia, South America, North America, Europe, and Africa) where glutinous rice is grown for preservation at the International Rice Genebank (IRGC). The International Rice Research Institute (IRRI) has described Laos as a "collector's paradise". Laos has the largest biodiversity of sticky rice in the world. IRRI-trained collectors gathered more than 13,500 samples and 3,200 varieties from Laos alone.

Composition
Glutinous rice is distinguished from other types of rice by having no (or negligible amounts of) amylose and high amounts of amylopectin (the two components of starch). Amylopectin is responsible for the sticky quality of glutinous rice. The difference has been traced to a single mutation that farmers selected.

Like all types of rice, glutinous rice does not contain dietary gluten (i.e. does not contain glutenin and gliadin) and should be safe for gluten-free diets.

Glutinous rice can be used either milled or unmilled (that is, with the bran removed or not removed). Milled glutinous rice is white and fully opaque (unlike non-glutinous rice varieties, which are somewhat translucent when raw), whereas the bran can give unmilled glutinous rice a purple or black colour. Black and purple glutinous rice are distinct strains from white glutinous rice.  In developing Asia, there is little regulation, and some governments have issued advisories about toxic dyes being added to colour adulterated rice. Both black and white glutinous rice can be cooked as discrete grains or ground into flour and cooked as a paste or gel.

Use in foods

Sticky rice is used in many recipes throughout Southeast and East Asia, such as in dumplings, as a filling or side in spicy dishes, with beans and fried by itself. (Rice cakes.)

Bangladesh
In Bangladesh and especially in the Chittagong (Cox's Bazar and Sylhet areas), sticky rice called  bini dhan (unhusked sticky rice) is prevalent. Both white and pink varieties are cultivated at many homestead farms. Husked sticky rice is called bini choil (chal) in some dialects.  Boiled or steamed bini choil is called Bini Bhat. Served with a curry of fish or meat and grated coconut, Bini Bhat is a popular breakfast. Sometimes it is eaten with a splash of sugar, salt, and coconut alone. Bin dhan is also used to make  khoi (popcorn-like puffed rice) and chida (bitten husked rice). 

Many other sweet items made of bini choil are also popular:
 
One of the favourite pitas made of bini choil  is atikka pita (pitha). It is made with a mixture of cubed or small sliced coconut, white or brown sugar, ripe bananas and bini choil wrapped with banana leaf and steamed.
 
Another delicacy is Patishapta pita made of ground bini choil. Ground bini choil is sprayed over a hot pan and a mixture of grated coconut, sugar, and milk powder; then, ghee is sprayed over that and rolled out. Dumplings made of powdered fried bini choil  called laru. First, bini choil is fried and ground into flour. This flour is mixed with sugar or brown sugar, and ghee or butter and is made into small balls or dumplings.
 
One kind of porridge or khir made of bini choil is called modhu (honey) bhat. This modhu bhat becomes naturally sweet without mixing any sugar. It is one of the delicacies of local people. To make modhu bhat first, prepare some normal paddy or rice (dhan) for germination by soaking it in the water for a few days. After coming out of the little sprout dry the paddy and husk and grind the husked rice called jala choil into flour. It tastes sweet. Mixing this sweet flour with freshly boiled or steamed warm bini bhat and then fermenting the mixture overnight yields modhu bhat. It is eaten either on its own or with milk, jaggery or grated coconut.

Cambodia

Glutinous rice is known as bay damnaeb in Khmer.

In Cambodian cuisine, glutinous rice is used exclusively for desserts and is an essential ingredient for most sweet dishes, such as ansom chek, kralan, and num ple aiy.

China
In the Chinese language, glutinous rice is known as nuòmǐ (糯米) or chu̍t-bí (秫米) in Hokkien.

Glutinous rice is also often ground to make glutinous rice flour. This flour is made into niangao and sweet-filled dumplings tangyuan, both of which are commonly eaten at Chinese New Year. It is also used as a thickener and for baking.

Glutinous rice or glutinous rice flour are both used in many Chinese bakery products and in many varieties of dim sum. They produce a flexible, resilient dough, which can take on the flavours of whatever other ingredients are added to it.  Cooking usually consists of steaming or boiling, sometimes followed by pan-frying or deep-frying.

Sweet glutinous rice is eaten with red bean paste.

Nuòmǐ fàn (糯米飯), is steamed glutinous rice usually cooked with Chinese sausage, chopped Chinese mushrooms, chopped barbecued pork, and optionally dried shrimp or scallop (the recipe varies depending on the cook's preference).

Zongzi (Traditional Chinese 糭子/糉子, Simplified Chinese 粽子) is a dumpling consisting of glutinous rice and sweet or savoury fillings wrapped in large flat leaves (usually bamboo), which is then boiled or steamed. It is especially eaten during the Dragon Boat Festival but may be eaten at any time of the year. It is popular as an easily transported snack, or a meal to consume while travelling. It is a common food among Chinese in Hong Kong,  Singapore and Malaysia.

Cifangao (Traditional Chinese 糍飯糕, Simplified Chinese 糍饭糕) is a popular breakfast food originating in Eastern China consisting of cooked glutinous rice compressed into squares or rectangles, and then deep-fried. Additional seasoning and ingredients such as beans, zha cai, and sesame seeds may be added to the rice for added flavour. It has a similar appearance and external texture to hash browns.

Cifantuan (Traditional Chinese 糍飯糰, Simplified Chinese 糍饭团) is another breakfast food consisting of a piece of youtiao tightly wrapped in cooked glutinous rice, with or without additional seasoning ingredients. Japanese onigiri resembles this Chinese food.

Lo mai gai (糯米雞) is a dim sum dish consisting of glutinous rice with chicken in a lotus-leaf wrap, which is then steamed. It is served as a dim sum dish in Hong Kong, Singapore, and Malaysia.

Ba bao fan (八寶飯), or "eight treasure rice", is a dessert made from glutinous rice, steamed and mixed with lard, sugar, and eight kinds of fruits or nuts. It can also be eaten as the main course.

A distinctive feature of the Cuisine of the Hakka people of Southern China is its variety of steamed snack-type buns, dumplings, and patties made with a dough of coarsely ground rice, or ban. Collectively known as "rice snacks", some kinds are filled with various salty or sweet ingredients.

Common examples of rice snacks made with ban from glutinous or sticky rice and non-glutinous rice include Aiban (mugwort patty), Caibao (yam bean bun), Ziba (sticky rice balls) and Bantiao (Mianpaban or flat rice noodles).

Aiban encompasses several varieties of steamed patties and dumplings of various shapes and sizes, consisting of an outer layer made of glutinous ban dough filled with salty or sweet ingredients. It gets its name from the aromatic ai grass (mugwort), which after being dried, powdered, and mixed with the ban, gives the dough a green colour and an intriguing tea-like taste. Typical salty fillings include ground pork, mushrooms, and shredded white turnips. The most common sweet filling is made with red beans.

Caibao is a generic term for all types of steamed buns with various sorts of filling. Hakka-style caibao are distinctive in that the enclosing skin is made with glutinous rice dough in place of wheat flour dough. Besides ground pork, mushrooms, and shredded turnips, fillings may include ingredients such as dried shrimp and dry fried-shallot flakes.

Ziba is glutinous rice dough that, after steaming in a big container, is mashed into a sticky, putty-like mass from which small patties are formed and coated with a layer of sugary peanut powder. It has no filling.

Philippines
In the Philippines, glutinous rice is known as malagkit in Tagalog or pilit in Visayan, among other names. Both mean "sticky". The most common way glutinous rice is prepared in the Philippines is by soaking uncooked glutinous rice in water or coconut milk (usually overnight) and then grinding it into a thick paste (traditionally with stone mills). This produces a rich and smooth viscous rice dough known as galapóng, which is the basis for numerous rice cakes in the Philippines. However, in modern preparation methods, galapong is sometimes made directly from dry glutinous rice flour (or from commercial Japanese mochiko), with poorer-quality results.

Galapong was traditionally allowed to ferment, which is still required for certain dishes. A small amount of starter culture of microorganisms (tapay or bubod) or palm wine (tubâ) may be traditionally added to rice being soaked to hasten the fermentation. These can be substituted with yeast or baking soda in modern versions. Other versions of galapong may also be treated with wood ash lye.

Aside from the numerous white and red glutinous rice cultivars, the most widely used glutinous rice heirloom cultivars in the Philippines are tapol rice, which is milky white in colour, and pirurutong rice, which ranges in colour from black to purple to reddish brown. However both varieties are expensive and becoming increasingly rare, thus some Filipino recipes nowadays substitute it with dyed regular glutinous rice or infuse purple yam (ube) to achieve the same colouration.

Dessert delicacies in the Philippines are known as kakanin (from kanin, "prepared rice"). These were originally made primarily from rice, but in recent centuries, the term has come to encompass dishes made from other types of flour, including corn flour (masa), cassava, wheat, and so on.  Glutinous rice figures prominently in two main subtypes of kakanin: the puto (steamed rice cakes), and the bibingka (baked rice cakes). Both largely utilize glutinous rice galapong. A notable variant of puto is puto bumbong, which is made with pirurutong.

Other kakanin that use glutinous rice include suman, biko, and sapin-sapin among others. There is also a special class of boiled galapong dishes like palitaw, moche, mache, and masi. Fried galapong is also used to make various types of buchi, which are the local Chinese-Filipino versions of jian dui. They are also used to make puso, which are boiled rice cakes in woven leaf pouches.

Aside from kakanin, glutinous rice is also used in traditional Filipino rice gruels or porridges known as lugaw. They include both savory versions like arroz caldo or goto which are similar to Chinese-style congee; and dessert versions like champorado, binignit, and ginataang mais.

Indonesia
Glutinous rice is known as beras ketan or simply ketan in Java and most of Indonesia, and pulut in Sumatra. It is widely used as an ingredient for a wide variety of sweet, savoury, or fermented snacks. Glutinous rice is used as either hulled grains or milled into flour. It is usually mixed with santan, meaning coconut milk in Indonesian, along with a bit of salt to add some taste. Glutinous rice is rarely eaten as a staple. One example is lemang, which is glutinous rice and coconut milk cooked in bamboo stems lined by banana leaves. Glutinous rice is also sometimes used in a mix with normal rice in rice dishes such as nasi tumpeng or nasi tim. It is widely used during the Lebaran seasons as traditional food. It is also used in the production of alcoholic beverages such as tuak and brem bali.

Savoury snacks
 Ketan - traditionally refers to the glutinous rice itself as well as sticky rice delicacy in its simplest form. The handful mounds of glutinous rice are rounded and sprinkled with grated coconut, either fresh or sauteed as serundeng.
 Ketupat - square-shaped crafts made from the same local leaves as palas, but it is usually filled with regular rice grains instead of pulut, though it depends on the maker.
 Gandos - a snack made from ground glutinous rice mixed with grated coconut, and fried.
 Lemang - wrapped in banana leaves and inside a bamboo, and left to be barbecued/grilled on an open fire, to make the taste and texture tender and unique
 Lemper - cooked glutinous rice with shredded meat inside and wrapped in banana leaves, popular in Java
 Nasi kuning - either common rice or glutinous rice can be made into ketan kuning, yellow rice coloured with turmeric
 Songkolo or Sokko - steamed black glutinous rice serves with serundeng, anchovies, and sambal. It was very popular in Makassar
 Tumpeng - glutinous rice can be made into tumpeng nasi kuning, yellow rice coloured by turmeric, and shaped into a cone.

Sweet snacks
 Variety of kue - glutinous rice flour is also used in certain traditional local desserts, known as kue, such as kue lapis.
 Bubur ketan hitam - black glutinous rice porridge with coconut milk and palm sugar syrup
 Candil - glutinous rice flour cake with sugar and grated coconut
 Dodol - traditional sweets made of glutinous rice flour and coconut sugar. Similar variants include wajik (or wajit).
 Gemblong - white glutinous rice flour balls smeared with palm sugar caramel. In East Java, it was known as getas, except it uses black glutinous rice flour as the main ingredient.
 Jipang (food) - popped glutinous rice held together by caramelized sugar
 Klepon - glutinous rice flour balls filled with palm sugar and coated with grated coconut
 Lupis - glutinous rice wrapped in individual triangles using banana leaves and left to boil for a few hours. The rice pieces are then tossed with grated coconut all over and served with palm sugar syrup.
 Onde-onde - glutinous rice flour balls filled with sweetened mung bean paste and coated with sesame similar to Jin deui
 Wingko babat - baked glutinous rice flour with coconut

Fermented snacks
 Brem - solid cake from the dehydrated juice of pressed fermented glutinous rice
 Tapai ketan - cooked glutinous rice fermented with yeast, wrapped in banana or roseapple leaves. Usually eaten as it is or in a mixed cold dessert

Crackers
 Rengginang - traditional rice crackers related to kerupuk

In addition, glutinous rice dishes adapted from other cultures are just as easily available. Examples include kue moci (mochi, Japanese) and bacang (zongzi, Chinese).

Japan

In Japan, glutinous rice is known as mochigome. It is used in traditional dishes such as sekihan also known as Red bean rice, okowa, and ohagi. It may also be ground into mochiko (もち粉) a rice flour, used to make mochi (もち) which are known as sweet rice cakes. Mochi a traditional rice cake prepared for the Japanese New Year but also eaten year-round. Many different types of mochi exist from different regions, and they are normally flavoured with traditional ingredients red beans, water chestnuts, green tea and pickled cherry flowers. See also Japanese rice.

Korea
In Korea, glutinous rice is called chapssal (Hangul: 찹쌀), and its characteristic stickiness is called chalgi (Hangul: 찰기). Cooked rice made of glutinous rice is called chalbap (Hangul: 찰밥) and rice cakes (Hangul: 떡, ddeok) are called chalddeok or chapssalddeok (Hangul: 찰떡, 찹쌀떡). Chalbap is used as stuffing in samgyetang (Hangul: 삼계탕).

Laos

Along the Greater Mekong Sub-region, the Lao have been cultivating glutinous rice for approximately 4000 - 6000 years. Glutinous rice is the national dish of Laos. In Laos, a tiny landlocked nation with a population of approximately 6 million, per-capita sticky rice consumption is the highest on earth at 171 kg or 377 pounds per year. 
Sticky rice is deeply ingrained in the culture, religious tradition, and national identity of Laos (see Lao cuisine). Sticky rice is considered the essence of what it means to be Lao. It has been said that no matter where they are in the world, sticky rice will always be the glue that holds the Lao communities together, connecting them to their culture and to Laos. Lao people often identify themselves as the "children of sticky rice" and if they did not eat sticky rice, they would not be Lao.

Sticky rice is known as khao niao (Lao:ເຂົ້າໜຽວ): khao means rice, and niao means sticky. It is cooked by soaking for several hours and then steaming in a bamboo basket or houat (Lao: ຫວດ). After that, it should be turned out on a clean surface and kneaded with a wooden paddle to release the steam; this results in rice balls that will stick to themselves but not to fingers. The large rice ball is kept in a small basket made of bamboo or thip khao (Lao:ຕິບເຂົ້າ). The rice is sticky but dry, rather than wet and gummy-like non-glutinous varieties. Laotians consume glutinous rice as part of their main diet; they also use toasted glutinous rice khao khoua (Lao:ເຂົ້າຄົ່ວ) to add a nut-like flavour to many dishes.  A popular Lao meal is a combination of larb (Lao:ລາບ), Lao grilled chicken ping gai (Lao:ປີ້ງໄກ່), spicy green papaya salad dish known as tam mak hoong (Lao:ຕຳໝາກຫູ່ງ), and sticky rice (khao niao).

Khao lam (Lao:ເຂົ້າຫລາມ): sticky rice is mixed with coconut milk, red or black bean, or taro, and is filled in a bamboo tube. The tube is roasted until all the ingredients are cooked and blended together to give a sweet aromatic treat. Khao Lam is such a popular food for Laotians and is sold on the streets.
Nam Khao (Lao:ແໝມເຂົ້າ): sticky rice has also been used for preparing a popular dish from Laos called Nam Khao (or Laotian crispy rice salad). It is made with a deep-fried mixture of sticky rice and jasmine rice balls, chunks of Lao-style fermented pork sausage called som moo, chopped peanuts, grated coconut, sliced scallions or shallots, mint, cilantro, lime juice, fish sauce, and other ingredients.
Khao Khua (Lao:ເຂົ້າຂົ້ວ): sticky rice are toasted and crushed. Khao Khua is a necessary ingredient for preparing a national Laotian dish called Larb (Lao:ລາບ) and Nam Tok (Lao:ນ້ຳຕົກ) that are popular for ethnic Lao people living in both Laos and in the Northeastern region of Thailand called Isan.
Khao tom (Lao:ເຂົ້າຕົ້ມ): a steamed mixture of khao niao with sliced fruits and coconut milk wrapped in banana leaf.
Khao jee: Lao sticky rice pancakes with egg coating, an ancient Laotian cooking method of grilling glutinous rice or sticky rice over an open fire.
Sai Krok (Lao:ໄສ້ກອກ): Lao sausage made from coarsely chopped fatty pork seasoned with lemongrass, galangal, kaffir lime leaves, shallots, cilantro, chillies, garlic, salt, and sticky rice.
Or lam (Lao:ເອາະຫຼາມ): a mildly spicy and tongue-numbing stew originating from Luang Prabang, Laos.
Lao-Lao (Lao:ເຫລົ້າລາວ): Laotian rice whisky produced in Laos.

Khao niao is also used as an ingredient in desserts. Khao niao mixed with coconut milk can be served with ripened mango or durian.

Malaysia

In Malaysia,  glutinous rice is known as pulut. It is usually mixed with santan (coconut milk) along with a bit of salt to add some taste. It is widely used during the Raya festive seasons as traditional food which is shared with certain parts of Indonesia, such as:
 Dodol - traditional sweets made of glutinous rice flour and coconut sugar. Similar variants are wajik (or wajit).
 Inang-inang - glutinous rice cracker. Popular in Melaka. 
 Kelupis - a type of glutinous rice kuih in East Malaysia.
 Ketupat - square-shaped crafts made from the same local leaves as palas, but it is usually filled with regular rice grains instead of pulut, though it depends on the maker.
 Kochi - Malay-Peranakan sweet and sticky kuih.
 Lamban - another type of glutinous rice dessert in East Malaysia.
 Lemang - wrapped in banana leaves and inside a bamboo, and left to be barbecued/grilled on an open fire, to make the taste and texture tender and unique.
 Pulut inti – wrapped in banana leaf in the shape of a pyramid, this kuih consists of glutinous rice with a covering of grated coconut candied with palm sugar.
 Pulut panggang – glutinous rice parcels stuffed with a spiced filling, then wrapped in banana leaves and char-grilled. Depending on the regional tradition, the spiced filling may include pulverised dried prawns, caramelised coconut paste or beef floss. In the state of Sarawak, the local pulut panggang contains no fillings and is wrapped in pandan leaves instead.
 Tapai - cooked glutinous rice fermented with yeast, wrapped in banana, rubber tree or roseapple leaves.

Myanmar
Glutinous rice, called kao hnyin, is very popular in Myanmar (also known as Burma).
 Kao hnyin baung is a breakfast dish with boiled peas (pèbyouk) or with a variety of fritters, such as urad dal (baya gyaw), served on a banana leaf. It may be cooked wrapped in a banana leaf, often with peas, and served with a sprinkle of salted toasted sesame seeds and often grated coconut.
 The purple variety, known as kao hynin ngacheik, is equally popular cooked as ngacheik paung.
 They may both be cooked and pounded into cakes with sesame called hkaw bouk, another favourite version in the north among the Shan and the Kachin, and served grilled or fried.
 The Htamanè pwè festival takes place on the full moon of Dabodwè() (February), when htamanè is cooked in a huge wok.  Two men, each with a wooden spoon the size of an oar, and a third man coordinate the action of folding and stirring the contents, which include kao hnyin, ngacheik, coconut shavings, peanuts, sesame and ginger in peanut oil.
 Si htamin is glutinous rice cooked with turmeric and onions in peanut oil, and served with toasted sesame and crisp-fried onions; it is a popular breakfast like kao hnyin baung and ngacheik paung.
 Paung din or "Kao hyin kyi tauk" is another ready-to-eat portable form cooked in a segment of bamboo.  When the bamboo is peeled off, a thin skin remains around the rice and also gives off a distinctive aroma.

 Mont let kauk  is made from glutinous rice flour; it is donut-shaped and fried like baya gyaw, but eaten with a dip of jaggery or palm sugar syrup.
 Nga pyaw douk or "Kao hynin htope", banana in glutinous rice, wrapped in banana leaf and steamed and served with grated coconut - another favourite snack, like kao hnyin baung and mont let kauk,  sold by street hawkers.
 Mont lone yay baw are glutinous rice balls with jaggery inside, thrown into boiling water in a huge wok, and ready to serve as soon as they resurface. Their preparation is a tradition during Thingyan, the Burmese New Year festival.
 Htoe mont, glutinous rice cake with raisins, cashews and coconut shavings, is a traditional dessert for special occasions. It is appreciated as a gift item from Mandalay.

Nepal
In Nepal, Latte/Chamre is a popular dish made from glutinous rice during Teej festival, the greatest festival of Nepalese women.

Northeastern India
Sticky rice called bora saul is the core component of indigenous Assamese sweets, snacks, and breakfast. This rice is widely used in the traditional sweets of Assam, which are very different from the traditional sweets of India whose basic component is milk.

Such traditional sweets in Assam are Pitha (Narikolor pitha, Til pitha, Ghila pitha, Tel pitha, Keteli pitha, Sunga pitha, Sunga saul etc.).  Also, its powder form is used as breakfast or other light meals directly with milk. They are called Pitha guri (if the powder was done without frying the rice, by just crushing it after soaking) or Handoh guri (if rice is dry fried first, and then crushed).

The soaked rice is also cooked with no added water inside a special kind of bamboo (called sunga saul bnaah). This meal is called sunga saul.

During religious ceremonies, indigenous Assamese communities make Mithoi (Kesa mithoi and Poka mithoi) using Gnud with it. Sometimes Bhog, Payokh are also made from it using milk and sugar with it.

Different indigenous Assamese communities make rice beer from sticky rice, preferring it over other varieties of rice for the sweeter and more alcoholic result. This rice beer is also offered to their gods and ancestors (demi-gods). Rice cooked with it is also taken directly as lunch or dinner on rare occasions.
Similarly, other indigenous communities from NE India use sticky rice in various forms similar to the native Assamese style in their cuisine.

Thailand
In Thailand, glutinous rice is known as khao niao (lit. 'sticky rice') in central Thailand and Isan, and as khao nueng (lit. 'steamed rice') in northern Thailand. Sticky rice at the table is typically served individually in a small woven basket .

Steamed glutinous rice is one of the main ingredients in making the sour-fermented pork skinless sausage called naem, or its northern Thai equivalent chin som, which can be made from pork, beef, or water buffalo meat. It is also essential for the fermentation process in the northeastern Thai sausage called sai krok Isan. This latter sausage is made, in contrast to the first two, with a sausage casing.
Sweets and desserts: Famous among tourists in Thailand is khao niao mamuang: sweet coconut sticky rice with mango, while khao niao tat, sweet sticky rice with coconut cream and black beans, Khao niao na krachik, sweet sticky rice topped with caramelized roasted grated coconut, khao niao kaeo, sticky rice cooked in coconut milk and sugar and khao tom hua ngok, sticky rice steamed with banana with grated coconut and sugar, are traditional popular desserts.
Khao lam is sticky rice with sugar and coconut cream cooked in specially prepared bamboo sections of different diameters and lengths. It can be prepared with white or dark purple (khao niao dam) varieties of glutinous rice. Sometimes a few beans or nuts are added and mixed in. Thick khao lam containers may have a custard-like filling in the centre made with coconut cream, egg and sugar.
Khao chi are cakes of sticky rice having the size and shape of a patty and a crunchy crust. In order to prepare them, the glutinous rice is laced with salt, often also lightly coated with beaten egg, and grilled over a charcoal fire. They were traditionally made with leftover rice and given in the early morning to the children, or to passing monks as an offering.
Khao niew tua dum is a sticky with sugar, thickened coconut milk and black beans.
Khao pong is a crunchy preparation made of leftover steamed glutinous rice that is pounded and pressed into thin sheets before being grilled.
Khao tom mat, cooked sticky rice mixed with banana and wrapped in banana leaf, khao ho, sticky rice moulded and wrapped in a conical shape, khao pradap din, kraya sat and khao thip are preparations based on glutinous rice used as offerings in religious festivals and ceremonies for merit-making or warding off evil spirits.
Khao niao ping, sticky rice mixed with coconut milk and taro (khao niao ping pheuak), banana (khao niao ping kluai) or black beans (khao niao ping tua), wrapped in banana leaf and grilled slowly over a charcoal fire. Glutinous rice is traditionally eaten using the right hand
Khao khua, roasted ground glutinous rice, is indispensable for making the northeastern Thai dishes larb, nam tok, and nam chim chaeo. Some recipes also ask for khao khua in certain northern Thai curries. It imparts a nutty flavour to the dishes in which it is used.
Naem khluk (Thai: ยำแหนม) or yam naem khao thot is a salad made from crumbled deep-fried, curried-rice croquettes, and naem sausage
Chin som mok is a northern Thai speciality made with grilled, banana leaf-wrapped pork skin that has been fermented with glutinous rice 
Sai krok Isan: grilled, fermented pork sausages, a speciality of northeastern Thailand
Glutinous rice is also used as the basis for the brewing of sato, an alcoholic beverage also known as "Thai rice wine".

Vietnam
Glutinous rice is called gạo nếp in Vietnamese. Dishes made from glutinous rice in Vietnam are typically served as desserts or side dishes, but some can be served as main dishes. There is a wide array of glutinous rice dishes in Vietnamese cuisine, the majority of them can be categorized as follows:
Bánh, the most diverse category, refers to a wide variety of sweet or savoury, distinct cakes, buns, pastries, sandwiches, and food items from Vietnamese cuisine, which may be cooked by steaming, baking, frying, deep-frying, or boiling. It is important to note that not all bánh are made from glutinous rice; they can also be made from ordinary rice flour, cassava flour, taro flour, or tapioca starch. The word "bánh" is also used to refer to certain varieties of noodles in Vietnam, and absolutely not to be confused with glutinous rice dishes. Some bánh dishes that are made from glutinous rice include:
Bánh chưng: a square-shaped, boiled glutinous rice dumpling filled with pork and mung bean paste, wrapped in a dong leaf, usually eaten in Vietnamese New Year.
Bánh giầy: white, flat, round glutinous rice cake with a tough, chewy texture filled with mung bean or served with Vietnamese sausage (chả), usually eaten in Vietnamese New Year with bánh chưng.
Bánh dừa: glutinous rice mixed with black bean paste cooked in coconut juice, wrapped in coconut leaf. The filling can be mung bean stir-fried in coconut juice or banana.
Bánh rán: a northern Vietnamese dish of deep-fried glutinous rice balls covered with sesame, scented with a jasmine flower essence, filled with either sweetened mung bean paste (the sweet version) or chopped meat and mushrooms (the savoury version).
Bánh cam: a southern Vietnamese version of bánh rán. Unlike bánh rán, bánh cam is coated with a layer of sugary liquid and has no jasmine essence.
Bánh trôi: made from glutinous rice mixed with a small portion of ordinary rice flour (the ratio of glutinous rice flour to ordinary rice flour is typically 9:1 or 8:2) filled with sugarcane rock candy.
Bánh gai: made from the leaves of the "gai" tree (Boehmeria nivea) dried, boiled, ground into small pieces, then mixed with glutinous rice, wrapped in banana leaf. The filling is made from a mixture of coconut, mung bean, peanuts, winter melon, sesame, and lotus seeds.
Bánh cốm: the cake is made from young glutinous rice seeds. The seeds are put into a water pot, stirred on fire, and juice extracted from the pomelo flower is added. The filling is made from steamed mung bean, scraped coconut, sweetened pumpkin, and sweetened lotus seeds.
Other bánh made from glutinous rice are bánh tro, bánh tét, bánh ú, bánh măng, bánh ít, bánh khúc, bánh tổ, bánh in, bánh dẻo, bánh su sê, bánh nổ...
Xôi are sweet or savoury dishes made from steamed glutinous rice and other ingredients. Sweet xôi are typically eaten as breakfast. Savoury xôi can be eaten as lunch. Xôi dishes made from glutinous rice include:
Xôi lá cẩm: made with the magenta plant.
Xôi lá dứa: made with pandan leaf extract for the green colour and a distinctive pandan flavour.
Xôi chiên phồng: deep-fried glutinous rice patty
Xôi gà: made with coconut juice and pandan leaf served with fried or roasted chicken and sausage.
Xôi thập cẩm: made with dried shrimp, chicken, Chinese sausage, Vietnamese sausage (chả), peanuts, coconut, onion, fried garlic ... 
Other xôi dishes made from glutinous rice include: xôi lạc, xôi lúa, xôi đậu xanh, xôi nếp than, xôi gấc, xôi vò, xôi sắn, xôi sầu riêng, xôi khúc, xôi xéo, xôi cá, xôi vị...
Chè refers to any traditional Vietnamese sweetened soup or porridge. Though chè can be made using a wide variety of ingredients, some chè dishes made from glutinous rice include:
Chè đậu trắng: made from glutinous rice and black-eyed peas.
Chè con ong: made from glutinous rice, ginger root, honey, and molasses.
Chè cốm: made from young glutinous rice seeds, kudzu flour, and juice from the pomelo flower.
Chè xôi nước: balls made from mung bean paste in a shell made of glutinous rice flour; served in a thick clear or brown liquid made of water, sugar, and grated ginger root.
Cơm nếp: glutinous rice that is cooked in the same way as ordinary rice, except that the water used is flavoured by adding salts or by using coconut juice, or soups from chicken broth or pork broth.
Cơm rượu: Glutinous rice balls cooked and mixed with yeast, served in a small amount of rice wine.
Cơm lam: Glutinous rice cooked in a tube of bamboo of the genus Neohouzeaua and often served with grilled pork or chicken.

Glutinous rice can also be fermented to make Vietnamese alcoholic beverages, such as rượu nếp, rượu cần and rượu đế.

Beverages
 Choujiu
 Sato (rice wine)
 Home brew sato kits
 Rượu nếp
 Rượu cần

Non-food uses
In construction, glutinous rice is a component of sticky rice mortar for use in masonry. Chemical tests have confirmed that this is true for the Great Wall of China and the city walls of Xi'an. In Assam also, this rice was used for building palaces during Ahom rule.

Glutinous rice starch may also be used to create wheatpaste, an adhesive material.

See also

 Cuisine of Assam
 Cuisine of Burma
 Cuisine of Cambodia
 Cuisine of China
 Hakka cuisine
 Cuisine of Indonesia
 Cuisine of Japan
 Cuisine of Korea
 Cuisine of Laos
 Cuisine of Malaysia
 Cuisine of the Philippines
 Cuisine of Thailand
 Cuisine of Vietnam

References

External links

 

Rice varieties
Bangladeshi cuisine
Bhutanese cuisine
Burmese cuisine
Cambodian cuisine
Chinese cuisine
Crops originating from China
Food ingredients
Indian cuisine
Japanese cuisine
Korean cuisine
Lao cuisine
Philippine cuisine
Thai cuisine
Vietnamese cuisine